Cinzia Fiordeponti, best known as Cinzia De Ponti (born 3 October 1960), is an Italian actress, model, television personality and beauty pageant titleholder who was crowned Miss Italia 1979 and second runner-up to Miss Universe 1982.

Life and career
De Ponti was born in Pescara. In 1979, while a law student at Teramo University, she won the Miss Italia beauty contest.
She later won the 1982 Miss Universo Italia contest and entered the Miss Universe 1982 competition, ranking third.

De Ponti studied as an actress at the "Studio di arti sceniche" drama school led by Alessandro Fersen. She appeared in a number of films in the 1980s, alternating main roles in comedy and genre films and minor roles in art films. Since the second half of the 1980s, she focused on television, working as an actress and a presenter.

Filmography

References

External links
 

1960 births
20th-century Italian actresses
Italian beauty pageant winners
Italian female models
Italian film actresses
Italian stage actresses
Italian television actresses
Italian television presenters
Living people
Miss Universe 1982 contestants
People from Pescara
University of Teramo alumni
Italian women television presenters